Daniel "Danny Kootch" Kortchmar (born April 6, 1946) is an American guitarist, session musician, producer and songwriter. Kortchmar's work with singer-songwriters such as Linda Ronstadt, James Taylor, David Crosby, Carole King, David Cassidy, Graham Nash, Neil Young, Steve Perry, and Carly Simon helped define the signature sound of the singer-songwriter era of the 1970s. Jackson Browne and Don Henley have recorded many songs written or co-written by Kortchmar, and Kortchmar was Henley's songwriting and producing partner in the 1980s.

Biography 
Kortchmar is the son of manufacturer Emil Kortchmar and author Lucy Cores. Kortchmar first came to prominence in the mid-1960s playing with bands in his native New York City, such as The King Bees and The Flying Machine, which included a then-unknown James Taylor (Kortchmar having been a long-time friend of Taylor's as both summered on Martha's Vineyard in their teens). In Taylor's autobiographical composition "Fire and Rain", the line "sweet dreams and flying machines in pieces on the ground" is a reference to the breakup of that band. During 1966, Kortchmar traveled to England, where he spent time as a session musician.

In 1967, Kortchmar joined The Fugs, appearing on their 1968 Tenderness Junction album before following bassist Charles Larkey to California, where they joined Carole King in forming a trio named The City. The group produced an album in 1968, Now That Everything's Been Said, which received scattered good reviews but was not a commercial success. The group subsequently broke up but Kortchmar continued backing King on her more successful solo career, including the groundbreaking 1971 album Tapestry. In 1970, Kortchmar reunited with Taylor on his breakthrough album Sweet Baby James. Kortchmar's work with Taylor and King made him one of the top LA session guitarists in the 1970s and 1980s. 

Kortchmar worked on his own, reuniting with Larkey in the band Jo Mama in 1970 and 1971 and recording solo albums Kootch (1973) and Innuendo (1980), but he experienced his greatest success backing other artists such as Linda Ronstadt, Warren Zevon, Harry Nilsson and Jackson Browne (when Browne recorded Kortchmar's song "Shaky Town" for the Running on Empty album, Kortchmar sang harmony vocals). In the 1970s he made three albums with Leland Sklar, Russ Kunkel, and Craig Doerge, as The Section.

Kortchmar recorded two albums as part of the band Attitudes, with Jim Keltner, David Foster and Paul Stallworth, for George Harrison's Dark Horse record label. The self-titled album Attitudes included Kortchmar's "Honey Don't Leave L.A.," which James Taylor also recorded. The second album, Good News, included several Kortchmar compositions.

He wrote music for the Cheech & Chong film Up in Smoke and he also produced recordings by Don Henley, Neil Young, Jon Bon Jovi, Stevie Nicks, Billy Joel, Hanson, Tracy Chapman, Louise Goffin and others. Kortchmar is featured on guitar on Carole King's 1975 album, Thoroughbred. 

In the early 1980s, Kortchmar toured and recorded extensively with Linda Ronstadt and appeared in two of her music videos. He can be seen playing guitar in the video for "Get Closer". In 1983, he played Linda's love interest in the music video for "What's New?". He also appeared with Linda when she performed on the twenty-fifth anniversary Grammy Awards telecast.

Kortchmar had a cameo as Ronnie Pudding (Spinal Tap's bass player in their early years) in the "Gimme Some Money" video segment of the 1984 mockumentary This Is Spinal Tap.

In 1984, he co-produced and played on Don Henley's album Building the Perfect Beast. On that album, Kortchmar wrote the songs "You're Not Drinking Enough" and "All She Wants To Do Is Dance". Also on that album, he co-wrote the songs "You Can't Make Love", "Man with a Mission", "Not Enough Love in the World", "Building the Perfect Beast", "Sunset Grill", and "Drivin' With Your Eyes Closed".

In 1989, Kortchmar co-produced and played on Don Henley's album The End of the Innocence. Also on that album, he co-wrote the songs "How Bad Do You Want It?", "I Will Not Go Quietly", "New York Minute", "Shangri-La", "Little Tin God", and "If Dirt Were Dollars".

In 1990, Kortchmar co-produced and played on Jon Bon Jovi's #1 album Blaze of Glory. In 1992, he co-produced Toto's eighth studio album Kingdom of Desire, he also wrote two of the songs on the album: "Kick Down the Walls" and the title track. In 1993, he co-produced and played on Billy Joel's album River of Dreams.

In 1995, Kortchmar produced and played rhythm guitar on several tracks of The Fabulous Thunderbirds album Roll Of The Dice.

In 1996, Kortchmar formed the group Slo Leak, playing primarily blues rock, and released an eponymous album.  

In 1999, the group released its second album, When the Clock Strikes 12. 

Kortchmar was brought aboard to produce Van Halen's abandoned second album with former Extreme singer Gary Cherone in 1999. 

In 2004, Kortchmar started a new group, the Midnight Eleven, and the band released its first album in 2005.

In 2006 he co-produced Hanson's album The Walk, which was released in the US in the summer of 2007.

Also in 2006, Kortchmar participated in the Japanese tour of the Verbs, a unit consisting of Steve Jordan and Jordan's wife, Meegan Voss.

In 2010 Kortchmar joined the Troubadour Reunion Tour supporting James Taylor and Carole King along with Section bandmates Lee Sklar and Russ Kunkel. In the souvenir book for the tour, his biography stated that he was working on an album of his songs that were originally recorded by other artists.

Discography

Solo 
 1973 Kootch (Warner Bros.)
 1980 Innuendo (Asylum)

With associated groups 
 1969 The City / Now That Everything's Been Said (Ode)
 1970 Jo Mama / Jo Mama (Atlantic)
 1971 Jo Mama / J Is for Jump (Atlantic)
 1971 (re-released 1996) James Taylor and the Original Flying Machine
 1972 The Section (Warner Bros)
 1973 The Section / Forward Motion (Warner Bros)
 1975 Attitudes / Attitudes (Dark Horse)
 1975 “Wind on the Water/ David Crosby and Graham Nash”
 1977 Running on Empty with Jackson Browne
 1977 Attitudes / Good News (Dark Horse)
 1977 The Section / Fork it Over (Capitol)
 1978 Warren Zevon / Nighttime in the Switching Yard (Excitable Boy LP)
 1981 Shot of Love with Bob Dylan
 1990 " Brent Bourgeois "/ Brent Bourgeois (Charisma Records)
 1995 The Fabulous Thunderbirds / Roll Of The Dice (Private Inc)
 1997 The Fabulous Thunderbirds / High Water (High Street / Windham Hill)
 2001 Boz Scaggs / Dig
 2005 Midnight Eleven / Midnight Eleven
 2018 Danny Kortchmar and The Immediate Family / Honey Don't Leave LA (Vivid Sound)
 2018 Danny Kortchmar and The Immediate Family / Live In Japan at Billboard Live Tokyo June 18, 2018 (Vivid Sound)
 2020 The Immediate Family / Turn It Up To 10 (Vivid Sound)
 2020 The Immediate Family / Slippin & Slidin EP (Quarto Valley Records)
 2021 The Immediate Family / Can't Stop Progress EP (Quarto Valley Records)
 2021 The Immediate Family / The Immediate Family (Quarto Valley Records)

References

External links 
 Danny Kortchmar Facebook page
  Danny Kortchmar unofficial website by italian fan

Danny Kortchmar Interview NAMM Oral History Library (2021)

1946 births
Living people
American session musicians
American people of Russian descent
American rock guitarists
American expatriates in the United Kingdom
American folk guitarists
American male guitarists
American country guitarists
American pop guitarists
American male songwriters
Record producers from New York (state)
Songwriters from New York (state)
Guitarists from Los Angeles
Guitarists from New York City
The Fugs members
20th-century American guitarists
Record producers from California